Finca Bellavista is a self-sustaining tree-house community in Costa Rica encompassing  of rainforest. It was founded in 2007. Residents are required to purchase a biodigester

, Finca Bellavista attracts 5,000 visitors a year

Founders 
Finca Bellavista was founded by Matthew Hogan and Erica Andrews

References

External links 
 

Populated places in Puntarenas Province
2007 establishments in North America
Residential buildings completed in 2007